The Rural Municipality of Blucher No. 343 is a rural municipality (RM) in the Canadian province of Saskatchewan within Census Division No. 11 and  Division No. 5. It is located in the north-central portion of the province on the South Saskatchewan River.

History 
The RM of Blucher No. 343 incorporated as a rural municipality on December 13, 1909. In 1958, the Patience Lake Mine was the first potash mine built in Canada.

Geography 
Numerous water bodies are located in the RM of Blucher No. 343. The larger lakes include Cheviot Lake, Crawford Lake, Judith Lake and Patience Lake.

Communities and localities 
The following urban municipalities are surrounded by the RM.

Towns
Allan

Villages
Bradwell
Clavet

The following unincorporated communities are located within the RM.

Special service areas
Elstow (dissolved as a village, December 31, 2014)

Unincorporated hamlets
 Blucher
 Cheviot

Demographics 

Attractions 
 Bradwell National Wildlife Area
 Christ Church - West Patience Lake (municipal heritage property)

Government 
The RM of Blucher No. 343 is governed by an elected municipal council and an appointed administrator that meets on the second Wednesday of every month. The reeve of the RM is Daniel Greschuk while its administrator is R. Doran Scott. The RM's office is located in Bradwell.

References 

B
 
Division No. 11, Saskatchewan